HellBent is a book by Anthony McGowan, published in 2005. It tells the story of Connor O'Neil and his dog, who are killed by an ice cream van and sent to hell. It was received very well, despite being called "Down-right disgusting just for the sake of it".

Plot summary
Sixteen-year-old Connor is on his way home from school when he is run down by an ice-cream truck. He is sent to hell with his dog, Scrote, who choked on an ice cream cone which rolled off the truck. There he is sentenced to spending all eternity reading intellectual books and listening to classical music with his personal devil tormentor, Clarence, and a transvestite Viking, Olaf. Eventually he meets a beautiful naked angel called Francessa who tells him that one person's hell could be his heaven. He sets out to swap hells with an elderly, classical music loving, homosexual gentlemen whose hell is to constantly play the PlayStation and have his penis fondled by nude women. He, Clarence, Scrote and Olaf set out on a long journey, of which if they are caught means they will be annihilated and be gone forever. On their travels, Olaf is captured and annihilated. Eventually they reach Connor's heaven, but he finds that Clarence has betrayed him. Olaf also betrayed him and is not dead, but then tries to help Connor and is this time killed for good. Connor and Scrote are sentenced to their ideal heaven, which has now become their worst nightmare as their tastes have changed. Connor notices a lever on the annihilator which has a plus and a minus. Figuring that it will reincarnate him if he changes it to plus and jumps in, he does so. It is left to the reader to decide whether Connor and Scrote were reincarnated or were fully annihilated.

External links 
Amazon.com
Random House  (author)
Random House 
Powells

References

2005 British novels
Young adult fantasy novels
British young adult novels
Heaven and hell novels
Ice cream vans
Doubleday (publisher) books